Amphiplica knudseni is a species of small sea snail, a marine gastropod mollusk in the family Caymanabyssiidae, the false limpets.

Distribution
This marine species is endemic to New Zealand.

References

External links
 To World Register of Marine Species

Caymanabyssiidae
Gastropods described in 1988